The 2018–19 season was 23rd consecutive season in the top Ukrainian football league for Vorskla Poltava. Vorskla competed in Premier League, Ukrainian Cup and UEFA Europa League.

Players

Squad information

Transfers

In

Out

Pre-season and friendlies

Competitions

Overall

Premier League

League table

Results summary

Results by round

Matches

Ukrainian Cup

UEFA Europa League

Group stage

Statistics

Appearances and goals

|-
! colspan=16 style=background:#dcdcdc; text-align:center| Goalkeepers

|-
! colspan=16 style=background:#dcdcdc; text-align:center| Defenders

|-
! colspan=16 style=background:#dcdcdc; text-align:center| Midfielders

|-
! colspan=16 style=background:#dcdcdc; text-align:center| Forwards

|-
! colspan=16 style=background:#dcdcdc; text-align:center| Players transferred out during the season

Last updated: 31 May 2019

Goalscorers

Last updated: 31 May 2019

Clean sheets

Last updated: 31 May 2019

Disciplinary record

Last updated: 31 May 2019

References

External links
Official website

Vorskla Poltava
FC Vorskla Poltava seasons
Vorskla Poltava